Narayan Rao Pawar (1925 – 12 December 2010) was an Indian independence activist and member of Arya Samaj. He became popular after plotting to kill the Last Nizam of Hyderabad, Mir Osman Ali Khan.

Career
Narayan Rao Pawar, along with two others (Jagadish Arya and Gandaiah Arya), threw a bomb at the Last Nizam on 4 December 1947 near King Kothi Palace. The sessions court awarded him the death sentence and a life sentence to Jagadish Arya.

However,  on 17 September 1948 his death sentence was commuted to life sentence.

Finally after serving 21 months in jail, he was released on 10 Aug 1949.

He died on 12 December 2010.

He was a follower of Raavi Narayan Reddy, the doyen of the Hyderabad Armed Struggle.

References

2010 deaths
1925 births
People from Telangana
Arya Samajis
Telangana Rebellion